Kamensk (Khaamin) is an urban locality (an urban-type settlement) in Kabansky District of the Republic of Buryatia, Russia. As of the 2010 Census, its population was 7,160.

Administrative and municipal status
Within the framework of administrative divisions, the urban-type settlement (inhabited locality) of Kamensk, together with two rural localities, is incorporated within Kabansky District as Kamensk Urban-Type Settlement (an administrative division of the district). As a municipal division, Kamensk Urban-Type Settlement is incorporated within Kabansky Municipal District as Kamenskoye Urban Settlement.

References

Notes

Sources



Urban-type settlements in Buryatia
Populated places in Kabansky District